The 1982 Chicago Marathon was the 6th running of the annual marathon race in Chicago, United States and was held on September 26. The elite men's and women's races were won by Americans Greg Meyer (2:11:00 hours) and Nancy Conz (2:33:24). A total of 4642 runners finished the race, an increase of nearly 400 from the previous year.

Results

Men

Women

References

Results. Association of Road Racing Statisticians. Retrieved 2020-05-25.

External links 
 Official website

1982
Chicago
1980s in Chicago
1982 in Illinois
Chicago Marathon
Chicago Marathon